Rochford is a local government district in Essex, England. It is named for one of its main settlements, Rochford, though the major centre of population in the district is the town of Rayleigh. Other places in the district include Hockley, Ashingdon, Great Wakering, Canewdon and Hullbridge.

It was formed on 1 April 1974 by the merger of the Rayleigh Urban District and the Rochford Rural District.

Energy and environment policy
In October 2009 the Rochford District was commended at a national level for its outstanding progress in boosting domestic recycling rates from "below 20 per cent to nearly 70 per cent", in the National Recycling Awards. Rochford District was nominated in the Local Authority Target Success category, and beat four other short-listed local authorities to claim the award.

In May 2006 a report commissioned by British Gas showed that housing in the district of Rochford produced the 9th highest average carbon emissions in the country at 7,219 kg of carbon dioxide per dwelling.

List of places in Rochford District
Ashingdon
Ballards Gore
Barling
Canewdon
Foulness Island
Great Stambridge
Great Wakering
Hawkwell
Hockley
Hullbridge
Little Wakering
Paglesham
Rawreth
Rayleigh
Rochford
South Fambridge
Stambridge
Sutton with Shopland
Wallasea Island

Economy 
Previously British World Airlines had its head office at Viscount House at London Southend Airport.

Arms

See also
Rochford District Council elections

References

External links
 Rochford District Council Home Page

 
Non-metropolitan districts of Essex